Aspen Mountain is a long mountain located approximately  south of Rock Springs, Wyoming and  south of Arrowhead Springs, in Sweetwater County. The mountain gets its name from patches of Quaking Aspen trees located on the north and southern faces of the mountain. Various older topographical maps name the mountain "Quaking Aspen Mountain". Its primary use is for radio communications and it houses towers for various local and state companies.

Other uses

Aspen Mountain also houses repeaters used by local highway patrol and local police and fire services for Sweetwater County, which are also present on nearby Wilkins Peak. If the local emergency repeaters on Aspen Mountain fail, they are automatically switched to the Wilkins Peak repeaters, and vice versa. The mountain also houses amateur radio repeaters, and a long range radar station (operated by the FAA) is the mountain's most visible feature.

Geology

Aspen Mountain lies to the north of the Uinta Mountains in the center of the Greater Green River Basin. It is part of the Rock Springs Uplift, and is composed of Miocene deposits.

Access

Aspen Mountain can be accessed via a number of routes. From Rock Springs, access starts from Blairtown/Flaming Gorge Road, and begins on a road known as Little Bitter Creek Road. Aspen Mountain can also be accessed via county highway 4-27, which begins on Wyoming Highway 430. From the south, the mountain can be accessed via US 191. The roads are usually in good condition year round, weather permitting. Travel is still possible during winter months, but a four-wheel drive vehicle is recommended. The road on the mountain itself is known as "Radar Tower Road."
Most of the mountain is not off limits, except for various radio towers with fences and the long range radar station, which features no trespassing signs and a fence around its perimeter. The radar site is also staffed 24 hours a day, 365 days a year, with up to two employees watching the site at a time. In the winter, their only means of travel is often via Snowcats.

Radio and television stations

KZUW 88.5 FM - Licensed to Reliance.
KUWZ 90.5 FM - Licensed to Rock Springs.
KQSW 96.5 FM - Licensed to Rock Springs.
KSIT 99.7 FM - Also licensed to Rock Springs (Both FM stations are located on the eastern half of the mountain, near the radar site).
KMRZ-FM 106.7 FM - Licensed to Superior, Wyoming, is the only FM station with a tower on the western half of the mountain.
KGWR Channel 13 -CBS- Rock Springs (Far eastern side of the mountain, second tower from east).
K45IA Channel 45 -The CW- Rock Springs
KXI34 162.550 MHz- NOAA Weather Radio - Operated by the Riverton National Weather Service office.

K26DK (former translator for KJZZ-TV and K45IA were shut down after the digital transition.

References

Gallery

External links
 Green River Basin. (Geological) by King, Clarence from 1876, David Rumsey Historical Map Collection
Aspen Mountain FM/TV only Radio Tower Locations and Info (RTLI).

Mountains of Wyoming
Mountains of Sweetwater County, Wyoming